Okanda is a small hamlet in the eastern coast of Sri Lanka within the Ampara District. It is known for its shrine dedicated to Hindu deity Murugan known as Ukanthamalai Murugan Kovil and for surfing. Pilgrims from the Eastern Province and the Northern Province stop over at the Okanda Murugan temple on their Murugan Pada Yatra voyage to Kataragama temple in the Southern part of the island.

Etymology
Okanda is a corruption of the verb Ukantai meaning "to sit", for at this holy site Lord Murugan and others 'sat down' (ukantār) and rested.

References

Villages in Ampara District